University of Dunaújváros (before 2016: College of Dunaújváros) is located in Hungary. Education center in Dunaújváros offers bachelor course Computer Engineer BSc, Engineering Business Management BSc, Communication and Media BA, Business Administration BA, Material Engineering BSc, Mechanical Engineer BSc, and master course Teacher of Engineering degrees.

References

External links

University of Dunaújváros

1950 establishments in Hungary
Business schools in Hungary
Universities and colleges in Hungary